The canton of Thoissey is a former administrative division in eastern France. It was disbanded following the French canton reorganisation which came into effect in March 2015. It consisted of 12 communes, which joined the canton of Châtillon-sur-Chalaronne in 2015. It had 15,587 inhabitants (2012).

The canton comprised 12 communes:

Garnerans
Genouilleux
Guéreins
Illiat
Mogneneins
Montceaux
Montmerle-sur-Saône
Peyzieux-sur-Saône
Saint-Didier-sur-Chalaronne
Saint-Étienne-sur-Chalaronne
Thoissey
Valeins

Demographics

See also
Cantons of the Ain department

References

Former cantons of Ain
2015 disestablishments in France
States and territories disestablished in 2015